Leroy Dujon (22 November 1918 – 10 January 1967) was a Jamaican cricketer. He played in one first-class match for the Jamaican cricket team in 1946/47. His son Jeff played international cricket for the West Indies.

See also
 List of Jamaican representative cricketers

References

External links
 

1918 births
1967 deaths
Jamaican cricketers
Jamaica cricketers
Sportspeople from Kingston, Jamaica